A syndrome is a set of medical signs and symptoms that are correlated with each other and, often, with a particular disease or disorder.

Syndrome may also refer to:
Syndrome decoding, in coding theory
Syndrome (The Incredibles), a fictional character 
Syndrome (video game series)
Syndrome (TV series),  a 2012 South Korean medical drama series
Syndrome (video game), a 2016 survival horror game for PC and consoles
Syndrome (album), a 2017 album by Chihiro Onitsuka